The 2015 World Series of Poker Europe (WSOPE) was held from October 8-24 at the Spielbank Casino in Berlin, Germany. There were 10 bracelet events, including a €550 Oktoberfest No Limit Hold'em event and a €550 Pot Limit Omaha event, the lowest buy-in for an Omaha tournament in WSOP history. The series of events  culminated in the €10,450 Main Event beginning on October 18, and the €25,600 High Roller event on October 21. This was the first WSOP Europe since 2013, and the first held in Germany.

Event schedule
Source:

Player of the Year
Final standings as of October 24 (end of WSOPE):

Main Event

The 2015 World Series of Poker Europe Main Event began on October 18 and finished on October 24. The event drew 313 entrants, generating a prize pool of €3,067,400. The top 32 players finished in the money, with the winner earning €883,000.

Final Table

*-Career statistics prior to beginning of 2015 WSOPE Main Event

Final Table results

References

World Series of Poker Europe
2015 in poker